The Oberliga Südwest was the highest level of the German football league system in the southwest of Germany from 1945 until the formation of the Bundesliga in 1963. It covered the two states of Rhineland-Palatinate and Saarland.

Overview
The league was introduced as the highest level of football in the French occupation zone in 1945, replacing the Gauligas as such. As was the French occupation zone, the Oberliga was split into a northern and a southern zone. The northern zone continued till 1963 to form the Oberliga Südwest while the southern zone was integrated into the Oberliga Süd in 1950. Until then, the champion of the Oberliga was determined by a home-and-away final between the two group winners.

The clubs in the Oberliga Süd came from the following Gauligas:
 Gauliga Westmark
 Gauliga Moselland
 Gauliga Baden (southern half only)

In addition to the Oberliga Südwest, four other Oberligas were formed in Germany in the 1940s.

Oberliga West (formed in 1947)
Oberliga Nord (formed in 1947)
Oberliga Berlin (formed in 1945, originally with clubs from west and east Berlin)
Oberliga Süd (formed in 1945)

Next to the Oberliga Berlin, the Oberliga Südwest was the smallest of the five Oberligas. Considering this, it is still impressive that it won two German titles through the 1. FC Kaiserslautern, led by the German captain Fritz Walter, still a legend in Kaiserslautern and Germany.

Set below the Oberliga were originally the Amateurligas. In 1951 the 2. Oberliga Südwest was formed to fit in between.

With the reintroduction of the German championship in 1948, the winner and runners-up of the Oberliga Südwest went on to the finals tournament with the other Oberliga champions.

In 1950, the southern group of the Oberliga Südwest was disbanded and its clubs joined the Southern German Football Association.

From 1948 to 1951 the clubs from the Saarland did not take part in the Oberliga Südwest, playing their own competition instead. The 1. FC Saarbrücken even took part in the French second division in 1948–49, winning the division but being refused further participation.

The 1. FC Kaiserslautern, Wormatia Worms and 1. FSV Mainz 05 took part in all of the 18 seasons of the Oberliga Südwest.

In 1978, the Oberliga Südwest was reformed, as the third tier of German football, but still covering the same region. From the clubs that played the last season in 1963, the 1. FSV Mainz 05, FK Pirmasens, SV Südwest Ludwigshafen, TuS Neuendorf and Eintracht Bad Kreuznach also saw the first season of the new league.

Founding members of the Oberliga Südwest (northern group)
1. FC Saarbrücken
1. FC Kaiserslautern
Borussia Neunkirchen
Wormatia Worms
VfR Frankenthal
FK Pirmasens
Phönix Ludwigshafen
1. FC Idar
BFV Hassia Bingen
1. FSV Mainz 05

Disbanding of the Oberliga

With the introduction of the Bundesliga, two teams from the Oberliga Südwest were admitted to the new Bundesliga. The remaining clubs went to the new Regionalliga Südwest together with six clubs from the 2nd Oberliga Südwest, one of five new second divisions.

While the admittance of the 1. FC Kaiserslautern as the most prolific team of the Oberliga and champion of 1963 was logical, the pick of the 1. FC Saarbrücken was more than dubious, having only finished fifth in the Oberliga that year and coming in below the other Saarland side, Borussia Neunkirchen.

Qualifying for the Bundesliga
The qualifying system for the new league was fairly complex. The league placings of the clubs playing in the Oberligen for the last ten seasons were taken into consideration, whereby results from 1952 to 1955 counted once, results from 1955 to 1959 counted double and results from 1959 to 1963 triple. A first-place finish was awarded 16 points, a sixteenth place one point. Appearances in the German championship or DFB-Pokal finals were also rewarded with points. The five Oberliga champions of the 1962–63 season were granted direct access to the Bundesliga. All up, 46 clubs applied for the 16 available Bundesliga slots.

Following this system, by 11 January 1963, the DFB announced nine fixed clubs for the new league and reduced the clubs eligible for the remaining seven places to 20. Clubs within the same Oberliga that were separated by less than 50 points were considered on equal rank and the 1962-63 placing was used to determine the qualified team.

Of the seven clubs from the league applying, the 1. FC Saarbrücken qualified early even though FK Pirmasens and Borussia Neunkirchen were less than ten points behind in the overall ranking and finished better in 1962–63. The rumor persists that Saarbrücken was chosen because it was from the home state of the later DFB chairman Hermann Neuberger (Chairman from 1975 to 1992), a very influential figure in German football. The DFB justified the choice of the 1. FCS with the fact that the club had a superior infrastructure to the other two. The 1. FC Kaiserslautern also qualified.

Points table:

 Source: DSFS Liga-Chronik , page: B 12, accessed: 4 November 2008
 Bold Denotes club qualified for the new Bundesliga.
 1 Denotes club was one of the nine selected on 11 January 1963.
 2 Denotes club was one of the 20 taken into final selection.
 3 Denotes club was one of the 15 applicants which were removed from final selection.
 4 Denotes club withdrew Bundesliga application.

Honours
The winners and runners-up of the Oberliga Südwest:

 Bold denotes team went on to win German Championship.

Placings & all-time table of the Oberliga Südwest
The final placings and all-time table of the northern group of the Oberliga Südwest:

Source:

Source:

* Denotes clubs from Saarland, which did not take part in the competition from 1948 to 1951.

Placings in the Oberliga Südwest (southern group) 
The final placings of the southern group of the Oberliga Südwest:

Source:

Until 1949, clubs in this league were not permitted to carry their pre-war name. Names given are the ones carried after 1949.

References

Sources
 Kicker Almanach,  The yearbook on German football from Bundesliga to Oberliga, since 1937, published by the Kicker Sports Magazine
 Süddeutschlands Fussballgeschichte in Tabellenform 1897-1988  History of Southern German football in tables, publisher & author: Ludolf Hyll
 100 Jahre Süddeutscher Fussball-Verband  100-year-anniversary book of Southern German football Association, publisher: Vindelica Verlag, published: 1997
 Die Deutsche Liga-Chronik 1945-2005  History of German football from 1945 to 2005 in tables, publisher: DSFS, published: 2006

External links
 Das deutsche Fussball Archiv  Historic German league tables
 Oberliga Südwest at Fussballdaten.de

Sud
Football competitions in Rhineland-Palatinate
Football competitions in Saarland
1945 establishments in Germany
1963 disestablishments in Germany
Sports leagues established in 1945
Ger